Freddie Ng Ting Fat (1991 – 19 December 2013) was a graduate student with a Bachelor of Pharmacy from the University of Hong Kong. He is well known for his inspirational spirit in never giving up despite being physically debilitated due to a rare, metastatic soft tissue sarcoma.

Personal life

Freddie was born in 1991, and achieved good grades in his primary school studies, which led him to be admitted by the locally prestigious secondary school La Salle College. He took his HKCEE in 2008, and obtained good results but just missed the criteria for the early admission scheme into university studies. Two months before his HKALE in 2010, a rare soft tissue sarcoma was diagnosed on his dominant right hand, and subsequent nerve excision operation left him with only two fingers movable, depriving him the ability to write and to participate in the HKALE to compete for a place in University. Despite these disabilities, Freddie was reported to have worked diligently, using his left hand to practice the basics of writing starting from the alphabets. He was exceptionally admitted by the University of Hong Kong under the Bachelor of Pharmacy programme in 2010.

His disease worsened throughout his university life as the cancer cells starts to spread to his thorax, abdominal cavities, and brain. Yet, his demonstration of courage and perseverance led him to his graduation in 2013 with first class honor and three distinction awards out of four available in the faculty. With great pain and weakness, he insisted to attend the graduation ceremony held in November 2013 during which 2,700 guests, parents, and graduates stood up and gave a round applause as he received his hard-won certificates and awards on stage. He finally succumbed to his disease a month later.

Using the sum of scholarships awarded to Freddie, together with funds raised from two memorial concerts, his parents founded the "Ng Ting Fat Education Foundation" to perpetuate Freddie's spirits and to support those who are striving hard despite having insurmountable difficulties. A "TF Ng Improvement Award in Pharmacy" has also been founded by his family and Freddie's alma mater to encourage those who showed significant improvements in academics, which was awarded to three students in the academic year 2013–2014.

References

1991 births
2013 deaths
Deaths from cancer in Hong Kong
Alumni of the University of Hong Kong